Sato Shiroishi (born 2 December 1992) is a Japanese handball player for Tokyo Women's College and the Japanese national team.

References

1992 births
Living people
Japanese female handball players
Asian Games medalists in handball
Handball players at the 2014 Asian Games
Asian Games silver medalists for Japan
Medalists at the 2014 Asian Games
21st-century Japanese women
20th-century Japanese women